Sally Moore Huss (born June 8, 1940) is an American former tennis player.

Moore grew up in Bakersfield, California and was an under 18 national champion in 1958. Further national titles came at the U.S. hard court championships (1958) and U.S. clay court championships (1959). She earned selection on the 1959 Wightman Cup team, playing both a singles and doubles rubber.

A Wimbledon junior champion in 1958, Moore made it to the women's singles semi-finals of the 1959 Wimbledon Championships, where her run was ended by Maria Bueno. She then partnered with Bueno to reach the women's doubles finals of the 1959 U.S. National Championships, which they lost to Jeanne Arth and Darlene Hard.

Moore ended 1959 with a career best singles ranking of nine in the world.

Under her married name Sally Huss, she is now a children's author and illustrator.

Grand Slam finals

Doubles (1 runner-up)

References

External links
 
 

1940 births
Living people
American female tennis players
Tennis people from California
Wimbledon junior champions
Grand Slam (tennis) champions in girls' singles
Sportspeople from Bakersfield, California
20th-century American women